The 1964 Tour de Suisse was the 28th edition of the Tour de Suisse cycle race and was held from 11 June to 17 June 1964. The race started in Murten and finished in Lausanne. The race was won by Rolf Maurer of the Cynar team.

General classification

References

1964
Tour de Suisse